Miang Noodles (Thai: เมี่ยงก๋วยเตี๋ยว) is a snack or a snack that is wrapped in various fillings. It is a savory dish and is a local food of Chonburi province in Thailand and is a healthy food because it contains vegetables and ingredients from all five groups.

History 

Miang noodles is a local dish of Chonburi and is a famous dish of Ban Bueng, Chonburi Province. Miang noodles consist of white noodles cut into bite-sized pieces, then put them in seasonings and drizzle with their dipping sauce to add more deliciousness to Miang noodles.  Miang Noodles are similar to Kuay Tiew Lui Suan( ). Miang noodles are often eaten with family and friends. This dish can be eaten in all seasons and is also popular with Chonburi residents as well as tourists who have visited Chonburi Province. In addition to Ban Bueng, it is also available in markets throughout Chonburi province such as Ang Sila Market( ), Four Regions Market( ), etc.

Ingredients 
Making Miang noodles is not difficult. It can be made into snacks or sold. Miang noodles in each village are similar but the taste of Miang sauce differs according to individual preferences.

Together with noodles, some or most of the following minor items are added and wrapped in noodles:
Big flat noodles cut to change the square shape,
grilled mackerel,
eggs,
roasted peanuts,
dried shrimp,
Chives leaves,
bean sprouts.

Miang Noodle Sauce Ingredients: Chili pepper, coriander, fish sauce, sugar, Key lime, water.

Variants 
Miang is a snack of the Lanna people in the past. It has a history of thousands of years, just like tea in China. But the Lanna people brought Miang or tea to eat instead. In the old days, every house had a miang for food and use to welcome guests. The way to eat Miang is to unwrap the Miang wrap, spread the Miang leaves with salt and ginger, roll it into words and suck the Miang. Miang sucking is popular to suck Miang after eating or sucking between meals to keep the mouth from empty. Miang's sour taste soothes the throat.

Miang of the Lanna way is different from the Miang  of the central region. There are many types of Miang in the central region, such as Miang Pla Mackerel, Miang Kham, which Miang Kham is a snack or snack, which consists of three elements:  Miang's side dishes, Miang sauce and betel leaves. Due to the period of time to collect Miang leaves, there will be 4 times a year. People therefore invented and adapted Miang leaves to be noodle sheets, lotus petals and turnips to become various types of Miang, such as Miang Noodles, Vegetarian san choy bau and Lotus Petal Miang.

References

External links 
 Miang noodle on YouTube

Thai noodle dishes
Chonburi province